The 1977 Merdeka Tournament was held from 16 July to 31 July 1977 in Malaysia.

Matches

Final

References 
Morrison, Neil; Saaid, Hamdan. "Merdeka Tournament 1977 (Malaysia)". RSSSF.com

Merdeka Cup